Wade Thomas Miller (born September 13, 1976) is an American former professional baseball starting pitcher, who played in Major League Baseball (MLB) for the Houston Astros (–), Boston Red Sox, and Chicago Cubs (–). He batted and threw right-handed. Miller attended Brandywine Heights High School in Topton, Pennsylvania. He is currently Alvernia University's pitching coach, a position he assumed in 2012.

Career
Miller was drafted out of Alvernia University (Reading, PA) by the Houston Astros, in 1996. He won 45 games in a three-year period for the Astros. Miller was one of the best young pitchers in the National League (NL) before injuring the rotator cuff in his pitching shoulder in 2004.

A year later, he was close behind at 15–4, 144, 3.35, and tied the club record with a 12-game winning streak over the summer.

In 2004, Miller was 7–7 with 74 strikeouts and a 3.35 ERA in 15 starts before going on the disabled list in June with a season-ending rotator cuff injury. The Astros believed he was playing hurt with shoulder and elbow injuries much of the year before, but Miller never complained about them.

A free agent before the 2005 season, Miller was signed by the Boston Red Sox. He started the year on the disabled list. The acquisition paid off well when Miller was activated on May 8, while starters Curt Schilling and David Wells spent time on the DL. Miller finished the 2005 campaign with a record of 4–4 and a 4.95 ERA.

On January 23, the Chicago Cubs signed Miller to a one-year, $1 million contract, with $1 million more in incentives. He made his first start of the 2006 season on September 9. Overall, Miller made five starts in 2006, finishing with a record of 0–2 with a 4.57 ERA. He filed for free agency after the season.

On November 9, 2006, Miller signed an incentive-laden, $1.5 million one-year extension to stay with the Cubs under new manager Lou Piniella. However, after three unsuccessful starts where he compiled a 10-plus ERA, Miller was once again placed on the DL in July 2007. He was placed on waivers granting his unconditional release from the Cubs in August .

On March 7, 2009, Miller agreed to a minor league contract with the Toronto Blue Jays. He retired from baseball, following that season.

In a nine-year MLB career, Miller compiled a 62–46 record with 749 strikeouts and a 4.10 ERA in  innings pitched.

After baseball
Miller was inducted into the Reading Baseball Hall of Fame on July 21, 2011.

See also
 Houston Astros award winners and league leaders

References

External links

Alvernia Golden Wolves baseball players
Baseball players from Pennsylvania
Boston Red Sox players
Houston Astros players
Chicago Cubs players
Major League Baseball pitchers
1976 births
Living people
Auburn Doubledays players
New Orleans Zephyrs players
Wilmington Blue Rocks players
Pawtucket Red Sox players
Peoria Chiefs players
West Tennessee Diamond Jaxx players
Iowa Cubs players
Tennessee Smokies players
Gulf Coast Astros players
Gulf Coast Blue Jays players
Greenville Bombers players
Quad Cities River Bandits players
Kissimmee Cobras players
Jackson Generals (Texas League) players
Las Vegas 51s players